Professor Matthew Bailes  is an astrophysicist at the Centre for Astrophysics and Supercomputing, Swinburne University of Technology and the Director of OzGrav, the ARC Centre of Excellence for Gravitational Wave Discovery. In 2015 he won an ARC Laureate Fellowship to work on Fast Radio Bursts. He is one of the most active researchers in pulsars and Fast Radio Bursts in the world. His research interests includes the birth, evolution of binary and millisecond pulsars, gravitational waves detection using an array of millisecond pulsars and radio astronomy data processing system design for Fast Radio Burst discovery. He is now leading his team to re-engineer the Molonglo Observatory Synthesis Telescope with a newly designed correlation system for observation of pulsars and Fast Radio (Lorimer) Bursts.

Bailes founded the organisation for development of the Virtual Room, an octagonal virtual reality system for displaying the planets, the Sun, the stars, the Milky Way, the galaxies and the universe, etc. He made the 3D film Realising Einstein's Universe.

Bailes is a committee member of the Australia Telescope Steering Committee and on advisory board of Collaboration for Astronomy Signal Processing and Electronics Research (CASPER). He was elected a Fellow of the Australian Academy of Science in 2022.

References

External links
Centre for Astrophysics and Supercomputing, Swinburne University of Technology

Academic staff of Swinburne University of Technology
21st-century Australian astronomers
Living people
Year of birth missing (living people)
Fellows of the Australian Academy of Science